Rinrijirca (possibly from Quechua rinri ear, Ancash Quechua hirka mountain, "ear mountain") is a mountain in the Cordillera Blanca in the Andes of Peru, about 5,810 m (19,836 ft) high. It is located in the Ancash Region, Huaylas Province, Santa Cruz District south of Pucajirca.

See also 
 Arhuaycocha
 Sintiru

References

Mountains of Peru
Mountains of Ancash Region